Erick Johan Aybar (born January 14, 1984) is a Dominican professional baseball shortstop who is a free agent. He has played in Major League Baseball (MLB) for the Los Angeles Angels of Anaheim, Atlanta Braves, Detroit Tigers and San Diego Padres.

Professional career

Los Angeles Angels of Anaheim
Aybar was signed by the then Anaheim Angels as an amateur free agent in 2002. He made his professional debut with the rookie ball Provo Angels. He spent the 2003 season with the Single-A Cedar Rapids Kernels, slashing .308/.346/.446 with 6 home runs and 57 RBI. In 2004, Aybar played for the High-A Rancho Cucamonga Quakes, batting .330/.370/.485 in 136 games with career-highs in home runs (14) and RBI (65). In 2005 he played for the Double-A Arkansas Travelers, hitting .303/.350/.445 with 9 home runs and 45 RBI. He began the 2006 season in Triple-A with the Salt Lake Bees.

Aybar made his MLB debut on May 16, 2006 a pinch runner against the Toronto Blue Jays. He recorded his first major League hit, in his first start, on May 20, 2006 against the Los Angeles Dodgers, a single to right field in the fourth inning off of Brett Tomko. Aybar played in 34 major league games in 2006, notching 10 hits in 40 at-bats.

Aybar hit his first career major league home run on September 25, 2007, in a game against the Texas Rangers. On the year, Aybar slashed .237/.279/.289 with 1 homer and 19 RBI. Aybar played in 98 games in 2008, with a batting line .277/.314/.384 with 3 home runs and 39 RBI. On September 5, 2009, Aybar tied a franchise record for most triples in a game with two against the Kansas City Royals. On September 8, 2009, Aybar had his first career walk-off hit, against the Seattle Mariners. In 2009, Aybar hit .312 (eighth in the AL) and posted the fourth-best OPS (.776) of all AL shortstops.

Aybar played in 138 games in 2010, batting .253/.306/.330 with 5 home runs and 29 RBI. The next year, he batted .279/.322/.421 with career-highs in home runs (10) and RBI (59) in 143 contests. After the season on November 1, 2011, Aybar was awarded his first Rawlings Gold Glove Award.

In 141 games in 2012, Aybar batted .290/.324/.416 with 8 home runs and 45 RBI. In 2013, Aybar appeared in 138 contests, with a batting line of .271/.301/.382. On July 10, 2014, Aybar was named an All Star for the first time in his career, replacing injured Kansas City Royals outfielder Alex Gordon. Aybar was hitting .283 with six home runs and 45 RBIs through 89 games at the time of his selection. He finished the season hitting .278 with seven home runs and 68 RBI in a career-high 156 games played. In 2015, Aybar slashed .270/.301/.338 in 156 games, along with 3 home runs and 44 RBI.

Atlanta Braves

On November 12, 2015, the Angels traded Aybar, Sean Newcomb, Chris Ellis and cash to the Atlanta Braves for Andrelton Simmons and José Briceño
. In 97 games for Atlanta, Aybar hit 2 home runs and 26 RBI with a batting line of .242/.293/.313.

Detroit Tigers
On August 16, 2016, the Braves traded Aybar to the Detroit Tigers in exchange for Mike Avilés and Kade Scivique. At the time of the trade, Aybar was batting an average of .242 with two home runs and twenty-six RBI. Aybar mustered 20 hits in 80 at-bats in 29 games for Detroit. On November 3, 2016, Aybar elected free agency.

San Diego Padres
On February 17, 2017, Aybar signed a minor league contract with the San Diego Padres organization, receiving a non-roster invitation to spring training. Aybar made the Opening Day roster for the Padres in 2018, and was selected to the 40-man roster on March 28. On April 18, 2017, Aybar made a pitching appearance for the Padres in a blowout loss against the Arizona Diamondbacks, and got catcher Chris Herrmann to hit into the final out of the game. On July 24, Aybar suffered a fractured foot and missed a month and a half as a result. With the Padres in 2017 he batted .234/.300/.348 with 7 home runs and 22 RBI in 108 games.

Minnesota Twins
On February 24, 2018, Aybar signed a minor league contract with the Minnesota Twins organization. He opted out of his contract and became a free agent on March 23.

Acereros de Monclova
On July 13, 2018, Aybar signed with the Acereros de Monclova of the Mexican Baseball League. In 43 games for Monclova, Aybar slashed .291/.354/.401. The next year, he batted .319/.412/.496 in 88 contests for Monclova. Aybar did not play in a game in 2020 due to the cancellation of the Mexican League season because of the COVID-19 pandemic. In 2021, Aybar slashed .318/.384/.450 with 3 home runs and 29 RBIs in 52 games. He was released by the team following the season on January 10, 2022.

Algodoneros de Unión Laguna
On February 9, 2022, Aybar signed with the Algodoneros de Unión Laguna of the Mexican League for the 2022 season. In 42 games, he batted .261/.324/.379 with 4 home runs and 17 RBIs. Aybar was released on June 21, 2022.

Personal life
Aybar is the youngest brother (by 10 months) of former Tampa Bay Rays infielder/outfielder Willy Aybar. His nephew, Wander Franco, currently plays for the Rays.

References

External links

Finale lifts Venezuela to title

1984 births
Living people
American League All-Stars
Arkansas Travelers players
Atlanta Braves players
Cedar Rapids Kernels players
Detroit Tigers players
Dominican Republic expatriate baseball players in the United States
Gold Glove Award winners
Los Angeles Angels players
Major League Baseball players from the Dominican Republic
Major League Baseball shortstops
Mexican League baseball second basemen
People from Baní
Provo Angels players
Rancho Cucamonga Quakes players
Salt Lake Bees players
San Diego Padres players
Tigres del Licey players
World Baseball Classic players of the Dominican Republic
2013 World Baseball Classic players